The Gayatri Vidya Parishad College of Engineering (Autonomous) Rushikonda (GVPCE) is a private college that was established in the year 1996. The educational trust, Gayatri Vidya Parishad (GVP) is formed, managed and promoted by academicians and technocrats in Visakhapatnam, India. The college offers instruction to 1200 undergraduate students in seven branches of engineering: chemical, civil, computer science and engineering, electronics and communication engineering, electrical engineering, mechanical engineering and information technology. The institution also offers Master of Computer Applications program affiliated to Jawaharlal Nehru Technological University, Kakinada. All the under graduation programs are accredited by NBA in 2006

Facilities
The campus is located in Madhurawada, on the outskirts of the city of Visakhapatnam. The institute is well accessible via NH16 with the nearest railway station and airport situated in Visakhapatnam. The resources in the campus include a post office, student service center, a stationery shop, canteen and banking facilities.

Library 
The library is named 'Prof. B. Sarvesvara Rao Library' after the former president of Gayatri Vidya Parishad, Emeritus Professor of Economics of Andhra University and Economic Adviser to the Government of Nigeria. The library is well equipped with modern facilities and resources in the form of CD/DVD-ROMs, video cassettes, online databases, micro documents, books, journals, theses, project reports, back volume of journals, and video lessons from NPTEL. The library is a member of AICTE-INDEST consortium under the aegis of the Ministry of Human Resource and Development and provides online access to IEL/IEEE, ASME, ACSE, Science Direct and DOAJ journals through DELNET. It houses 9,200 titles, 34,000 volumes, 130 national journals, 70 international journals and a digital library in which students can access 240 IEEE journals and 600 other journals through the Springer Science+Business Media Engineering Data Units.

Medical facility 
The health care center is located within the campus, with a resident doctor available during the college hours for both students and staff.

Hostel facility 
GVP has separate hostel facilities for boys and girls, well equipped with all amenities. All the hostels have their own cooking and dining rooms supervised by different in-charges and only serve vegetarian cuisine.

Sports 
The institution provides has both indoor and outdoor sporting facilities with a multi-station gym, table tennis hall, and 200m track for athletics inclusive of football and cricket turfs. Apart from them, cricket practicing nets, tennis, volleyball, basketball, throwball, and tennikoit courts are available for the students.

Rankings

The National Institutional Ranking Framework ranked it 188 among engineering colleges in 2020.

References

External links

 Official website

G V P College of engineering
Universities and colleges in Visakhapatnam
1996 establishments in Andhra Pradesh
Educational institutions established in 1996